The Uganda Film Festival Award for Best Television Drama is an award presented annually by Uganda Communications Commission (UCC) at the Uganda Film Festival Awards. The award which was introduced in 2016 to include television categories, is given in honor of a television producer who has exhibited outstanding production for television series.

Winners and nominees
The table shows the winners and nominees for the Best Television Drama award.

Multiple wins and nominations

By A Television Drama
No Television drama has won this award multiple times. However, several television dramas have received multiple nominations for this award over years as seen below;

By a Producer
No producer has received multiple wins for this award. Some producers have received multiple nominations for their television series. Richard Mulindwa received nominations for different television series.

Records
 In 2017, Irene Kulabako Kakembo was the first female producer whose television drama series (Yat Madit) was nominated for the award, and became the first female producer to win the award with the same series that same year.

References

Ugandan television awards